Real Love is the fourth live album by American experimental rock band Swans. It originally appeared as an official bootleg in 1986, then was reissued on Atavistic Records in 1996. Real Love was recorded from European shows on Swans' Greed and Holy Money tour between February and April 1986.

Track listing

Personnel
 Michael Gira – guitar, vocals
 Norman Westberg – guitar
 Jarboe – keyboards
 Ronaldo Gonzales – drums
 Ted Parsons – drums
 Algis Kizys – bass guitar
 G. F. Pfanz – mastering

References

1986 live albums
Swans (band) live albums
Albums produced by Michael Gira